Yujiulü Datan (pinyin: Yùjiǔlǘ Dàtán) (?–429 AD) khan of the Rouran from 414 to July, 429 with the title of Mouhanheshenggai Khagan (牟汗紇升蓋可汗).

Life 
He was a son of Yujiulü Puhun (郁久閭僕浑), thus a cousin of Yujiulü Hulü who in 414 was overthrown by his nephew Yujiulü Buluzhen. Later Buluzhen became involved in a love affair with a younger wife of Gaoche leader Chiluohou (叱洛侯). Chiluohou was an early supporter of Shelun who entrusted him with his son Sheba (社拔) . The younger wife revealed to Buluzhen that Chiluohou would support Datan against Buluzhen, as a sign of fidelity, sent him a golden rein. As a response, Buluzhen sent 8,000 cavalry against Chiluohou and burned all his properties while Chiluohou committed suicide. After this, Buluzhen attacked Datan hastily, however Datan came out victorious and strangled both Sheba and Buluzhen, eliminating both rivals and then declared himself khagan.

Reign 
He immediately allied himself to Feng Ba upon gaining throne and warred against Northern Wei. Datan led the troops to raid the border in winter of 415, but Emperor Mingyuan met him with the army. The Datan began to retreat but Wei general Daxi Jin (達奚斤) rushed after him. His forces ran into severe weather and suffered many casualties based on frostbite. This would start a theme that would last for centuries—often, Rouran would attack, and Northern Wei would counter-attack successfully, but then become unable to have decisive victories over Rouran. Meanwhile Datan reinforced relations with Northern Yan, sent a tribute of 3,000 horses and 10,000 sheep in 417.

In 423, almost immediately after Emperor Taiwu took the throne, Datan attacked Northern Wei with about 60000 soldiers. Emperor Taiwu engaged Rouran troops, and on the very first engagement became surrounded by Rouran troops, but he fought his way out of danger, and subsequently, he made nearly yearly attacks against Rouran, and each year, Rouran forces would elude him by retreating north, only to return south after he withdrew.

He was planning another invasion of Wei in 427, but destruction of Xia and capture of Helian Chang, forced him to reconsider and back down. Yet another raid was made by Rouran in 428 with 10.000 cavalry.

In 429, at the advice of Cui Hao, and against the advice of all other officials and his wet nurse Nurse Empress Dowager Dou, Emperor Taiwu attacked Rouran. Cui believed that further major conflicts with Liu Song were inevitable, and that Northern Wei must first deal Rouran a major defeat to avoid being attacked on both sides. However, Cui did not accompany Emperor Taiwu on this campaign, although he did inform Kou Qianzhi, another Wei official, who was, that the main Rouran force must be found and destroyed.  When Emperor Taiwu engaged Rouran and dealt it a major loss, but was unable to find its Datan, he did not want to advance any further in fear of a trap, and even when Kou informed him what Cui had said, he stopped the pursuit. Only later did he find out that he was actually close to Yujiulü Datan's position and could have easily found and destroyed Yujiulü Datan, and he regretted this greatly. Datan on the other hand died from an illness on his way and was succeeded in 429 by Yujiulü Wuti.

Family 
He had at least 4 sons and a daughter:

 Yujiulü Wuti
 Yujiulü Tulugui (郁久閭秃鹿傀)
 Yujiulü Qiliegui (郁久閭乞列归)
 Yujiulü Qilifu (郁久閭俟力弗) - ancestor of Yujiulü Furen (郁久闾伏仁, d. 29 November 586), a Sui dynasty official
 Yujiulü Zuozhaoyi (郁久閭左昭仪) - married to Emperor Taiwu, became mother of Tuoba Yu

He also had several younger brothers named Tāwu Wúluhú (他吾无鹿胡), Yuedai (悅代), Pili (匹黎), Yujiulü Fèng (郁久閭闾凤), Yujiulü Dafei (郁久閭大肥), Yujiulü Danibeiyi (郁久閭大埿倍颐) and Yujiulü Lin (郁久閭驎). Latter four submitted to Northern Wei and adopted Chinese surname of Lü (闾), a short form of Yujiulü. Dafei subsequently was created Prince Zhongshan (中山王) and was married to Princess Huoze (濩澤公主), daughter of Emperor Daowu. His other brothers Feng and Lin were created Marquis of Xingyang (荥阳公) in Northern Wei.

In popular media 

 He was portrayed by Bao Depan (包德磐) in Chinese TV Series "The Story of Mulan" (花木兰传奇)

References 
 History of the Northern Dynasties, vol. 86.
Book of Wei, vol.103

 

Khagans of the Rouran
5th-century monarchs in Asia